Club Deportivo Antequerano was a football club based in Antequera, Andalusia. The club came to play 4 seasons in Segunda División B. Club Deportivo Antequerano disappears in 1992.

In 1992, CD Antequerano merges with CD Puerto Malagueño to form current Antequera CF.

Season to season

4 seasons in Segunda División B
22 seasons in Tercera División

 
Defunct football clubs in Andalusia
Association football clubs established in 1939
Association football clubs disestablished in 1992
1939 establishments in Spain
1992 disestablishments in Spain